Grant Garland Teaff (born November 12, 1933) is a former American football player and coach.  He served as the head coach at McMurry University (1960–1965), Angelo State University (1969–1971), and Baylor University (1972–1992), compiling a career college football record of 170–151–8.  In his 21 seasons as head coach of the Baylor Bears football team, Teaff's teams won two Southwest Conference titles and appeared in eight bowl games.  His 128 wins are the most of any coach in the history of the program.  Teaff was inducted into the College Football Hall of Fame as a coach in 2001.

Early career
Teaff played football at Snyder High School in Snyder, Texas. He continued playing at the college level for San Angelo Junior College (now Angelo State University) and then for McMurry University in Abilene, Texas.  When McMurry head coach Wilford Moore was hired to coach for Lubbock High School in 1956, Teaff became his assistant. He then moved on to be an assistant at McMurry University from 1957 to 1959.

Teaff began his head coaching career at McMurry in 1960, serving there until 1965. Among his players were future Pittsburgh Steelers split end Dick Compton and future San Diego Chargers offensive lineman Ernie Park.  After a stint as an assistant coach to J. T. King at Texas Tech, Teaff became the head coach at Angelo State University from 1969 to 1971.

Baylor
In 1972, Teaff was hired by Baylor University.  Baylor originally hired Rudy Feldman from the University of New Mexico, but Feldman quit after one day, leaving the job to Teaff.  The Baylor football team had been 7–43–1 in the five seasons preceding Teaff's arrival.  Teaff quickly built Baylor into a competitive team and in 1974, Baylor won eight games and captured the Southwest Conference title for the first time since 1924.  In the process they defeated the Texas Longhorns, 34–24, after rallying from a 24–7 halftime deficit. It was Baylor's first victory over Texas in 17 years.  The 1974 season and the win over Texas are commonly referred to as the "Miracle on the Brazos," named after the Brazos River near the Baylor campus.

In 1978,  Teaff led his team to another unforgettable win. His 2-8 Baylor Bears were set to play #9 ranked Texas. Many of the Bears were injured and they were expected to lose. To compensate for the loss of healthy players, Teaff introduced what is now known as the Wildcat formation. To motivate his team, Teaff told them a story of two fishing Eskimos. One was an excellent fisherman, reeling in one catch after another, while the other couldn't land a single fish. The frustrated Eskimo asked his companion for the secret to successful fishing. His friend replied by pulling a worm out of his mouth, saying "you've got to keep the worms warm!" With this story, the coach let his team know that winning may cause momentary discomfort, but if they were able to put that aside for 60 minutes, the end result would be worth it. Teaff told his team "this game is yours”, pulling a worm out of his mouth. The Bears went on to win the game 38-14, finishing the season 3-8. 

Teaff remained Baylor’s head football coach until 1992, compiling a winning record and winning the Southwest Conference title for the last time in 1980.  His teams won the 1979 Peach Bowl, the 1985 Liberty Bowl, the 1986 Bluebonnet Bowl, and the 1992 John Hancock Bowl, his final game as coach.    His teams also earned invitations to the 1975 and 1981 Cotton Bowl Classic, the 1983 Astro-Bluebonnet Bowl, and the 1991 Copper Bowl.  His Baylor teams were notable for success against the University of Texas, finishing with a 10–11 record against the Longhorns.  By comparison, in the 15 seasons preceding Teaff's arrival and the 15 years following Teaff's departure, Baylor had a 1–29 record against Texas.

Later life and family
After retiring from coaching, Teaff became executive director of the American Football Coaches Association in February 1994, which is an organization headquartered in Waco, Texas. The AFCA represents coaches across the United States and is often consulted by the NCAA and the media regarding rule changes and developments that take place in college football.

Teaff and his wife have three daughters.

Head coaching record

References

External links
 

1933 births
Living people
American football linebackers
Angelo State Rams football coaches
Angelo State Rams football players
Baylor Bears athletic directors
Baylor Bears football coaches
McMurry War Hawks football coaches
McMurry War Hawks football players
Texas Tech Red Raiders football coaches
High school football coaches in Texas
College Football Hall of Fame inductees
People from Scurry County, Texas
Sportspeople from Waco, Texas
Players of American football from Texas